This is a list of Members of the Northern Ireland Assembly elected in 1982.

All members elected to the Assembly at the 1982 election are listed. Members are grouped by party.

The Social Democratic and Labour Party and Sinn Féin members did not take their seats in the Assembly and the Ulster Unionist Party members boycotted the Assembly for five months during 1984.

Members by party
This is a list of members elected in the 1982 Northern Ireland Assembly election, sorted by party.

Members by constituency
The list is given in alphabetical order by constituency.

Changes

♭ By-Elections

Subsequent changes of party or allegiance
A considerable number of MPAs, mainly Unionist, subsequently left or were expelled from their respective parties. Of UUP members, Jeffrey Donaldson joined the DUP in 2004 after a short spell as an Independent Unionist. Agnew became an Independent Unionist. Bleakes joined the Conservatives  but later became an Independent Unionist, while Dunlop took the opposite route, moving to Independent Unionist and then Conservative. McCartney stood as a Real Unionist in 1987 before forming the United Kingdom Unionists in 1995, where he was joined by Vitty who joined from the DUP. Kirkpatrick joined the DUP, rejoined the UUP before again switching to the DUP.

Of DUP members, Allister, Beattie, Calvert, Foster, Graham, Kane and McKee all later quit the party. Seawright (who was expelled from the DUP) Beattie and Graham were subsequently re-elected under different 'Protestant' or 'Protestant Unionist' labels. Davis and Thompson subsequently joined the UUP. In the case of the latter, this was after a spell as an Independent Unionist and he later quit the UUP to rejoin the DUP.

O'Hare quit the SDLP in January 1986 over the party's support for the Anglo-Irish Agreement. Sorley left the SDLP in the late 80s following a row over her acceptance of the M.B.E. and was re-elected to Magherafelt council in 1989 as an Independent.

Currie of the S.D.L.P. and Cushnahan of Alliance later became involved in Southern Irish politics and were elected for Fine Gael.

References

Bibliography
Northern Ireland Elections: Northern Ireland Assembly Elections 1982

Northern Ireland Assembly (1982)
 
Northern Ireland, Assembly 1982